Carter Evans is an American journalist who is CBS News' Los Angeles-based correspondent.

Biography
Carter Evans was born in Honolulu, Hawaii. In 1998, he graduated with a B.A. in Broadcast Journalism and a minor in Philosophy from Ithaca College. In 1995, he worked as a freelance reporter for the CBS affiliate KGMB in Honolulu, Hawaii. In 2003, he moved to Los Angeles to work for spent KCBS-TV/KCAL-TV. He then moved to New York City as an anchor for WNYW/WWOR-TV and as a freelance correspondent for CBS Newspath where he worked for CBS MoneyWatch. He then worked as a reporter for CNN Newsource where he served as a rotating host of CNN's financial Q&A program The Help Desk and covered the 2010 BP oil spill, the 2011 Japanese earthquake and tsunami, 2011's Hurricane Irene, the 10th anniversary of the September 11 attacks, and reported the Financial crisis of 2007–2008 direct from the New York Stock Exchange Trading Floor. In February 2013, he was named CBS News Los Angeles-based correspondent where he received recognition for his coverage of the 2013 shooting by Christopher Dorner.

Personal life
He is divorced from KTLA weekend anchor Courtney Friel, with whom he has two children. He married KTLA reporter Lauren Lyster in August 2018.

References

American television personalities
Living people
American male journalists
Journalists from Hawaii
People from Honolulu
Year of birth missing (living people)